Power play or powerplay or their plurals may refer to:

Sports 
 Power play (sporting term), a sporting term used in various games
 Powerplay (cricket), a rule concerning fielding restrictions in one-day international cricket
 Power play (curling), a rule concerning the placing of stones in mixed-gender curling
 PowerPlay Golf, a variation of nine-hole golf, featuring two flags on a green

Film 
 Power Play (1978 film), a 1978 British-Canadian political thriller film
 Power Play (2003 film), a 2003 American action film
 Power Play (2021 film), a 2021 Indian crime thriller film

Television 
 Power Play (1998 TV series), a 1998–2000 Canadian television series about a hockey team in Hamilton, Ontario
 Power Play (2009 TV program), a 2009 Canadian political affairs television program
 Power Play (Dutch TV program), a 1992–1993 Dutch video game television program
 Power Play, an American television program from Night Tracks that aired on TBS from 1985 to 1988 and from 1988 to 1989 as Power Play Dancin

Episodes 
 "Power Play" (Angel), a 2004 episode of the series Angel
 "Power Play" (Star Trek: The Next Generation), an episode of Star Trek: The Next Generation
 "Power Play" (Cheers), an episode of Cheers
 Power Play (Pretty Little Liars), an episode of Pretty Little Liars
 Power Play (Hit the Floor), an episode of Hit the Floor
 Power Play (Static Shock), an episode of Static Shock
 Power Play (White Collar), an episode of White Collar

Music 
 Power Play (April Wine album), 1982
 Power Play (Dragon album), 1979
 Power Play (quartet), an American barbershop quartet

Video games 
 PC PowerPlay, a PC games magazine published in Australia
 , a defunct German computer and video game magazine published by Markt+Technik
 PowerPlay (technology), a defunct standard for networked video gaming headed by Valve and Cisco Systems
 Powerplay Cruiser, a joystick released in the early 1990s
 Commodore Power/Play, a defunct video game magazine
 , an ZX Spectrum games

Literature 
 Power Play (novel), a Hardy Boys novel
 Tom Clancy's Power Plays, a novel series created by Tom Clancy
 Power Play (book 3 of the Petaybee Series) by Anne McCaffrey and Elizabeth Ann Scarborough
 Power Play: How Video Games Can Save the World, a 2017 book by Asi Burak and Laura Parker
 Power Play: Tesla, Elon Musk, and the Bet of the Century, a 2021 book by Tim Higgins

Other uses 
 Powerplay (theory), international politics theory, raised by Victor D.Cha
 AMD PowerPlay, a power management technology from ATI Technologies/AMD
 Power Play (audio drama), an audio drama based on the Doctor Who television series
 PowerPlay (lottery)

See also
 Power (play), a 2003 play by British playwright Nick Dear